Collector's Edition Box I & II are compilation albums by the English multi-instrumentalist Mike Oldfield released in 1990.

Included in the collector's package are the standard issue Virgin Records Picture-disc CDs.

Collector's Edition Box I 
 Hergest Ridge
 The Orchestral Tubular Bells
 Ommadawn

Collector's Edition Box II 
 Platinum
 QE2
 Five Miles Out

Tubular Bells/Amarok 
 Tubular Bells
 Amarok

References 

Mike Oldfield compilation albums
1990 compilation albums